Anthony Obame Mylann (born 10 September 1988 in Libreville, Gabon)  is a taekwondo practitioner who represented Gabon at the 2012, 2016 and 2020 Summer Olympics.

Obame is currently coached by former two-time world champion Juan Antonio Ramos.

He won the silver medal in the men's 80+ kg category at the 2012 Olympic Games, becoming the first Gabonese athlete to win a medal at the Olympics.

Obame defeated Kaino Thomsen and Bahri Tanrikulu en route to the gold medal match, which he lost to Carlo Molfetta of Italy. Obame led in the match, but lost on a judges' decision after the match ended in a tie. Obame said he was disappointed because of what he called a "youthful error."

Obame was greeted by thousands of supporters upon his return to Libreville. Obame said he felt "immense pride and joy" in having won the nation's first Olympic medal.

Obame represented Gabon at the 2016 Summer Olympics in +80 kg division. He was defeated by Mahama Cho of Great Britain in the first round. He was the flag bearer for Gabon in the Parade of Nations.

Obame competed in the men's +80 kg class at the 2020 Summer Olympics.

References

External links
 

Gabonese male taekwondo practitioners
1988 births
Living people
Sportspeople from Libreville
Olympic taekwondo practitioners of Gabon
Taekwondo practitioners at the 2012 Summer Olympics
Olympic silver medalists for Gabon
Olympic medalists in taekwondo
Medalists at the 2012 Summer Olympics
Taekwondo practitioners at the 2016 Summer Olympics
African Games silver medalists for Gabon
African Games medalists in taekwondo
Competitors at the 2011 All-Africa Games
Competitors at the 2015 African Games
Competitors at the 2019 African Games
African Games bronze medalists for Gabon
World Taekwondo Championships medalists
Taekwondo practitioners at the 2020 Summer Olympics
21st-century Gabonese people